White Fang 2: Myth of the White Wolf is a 1994 American Northern adventure film directed by Ken Olin and starring  Scott Bairstow, Alfred Molina, and Geoffrey Lewis. It is a sequel to the 1991 White Fang. Filming entirely took place in Aspen, Colorado as well as British Columbia, Canada's Metro Vancouver region. Released in theaters by Walt Disney Pictures on April 14, 1994, it was later released on VHS on October 19, 1994 by Walt Disney Home Video.

Plot

When Jack Conroy goes to San Francisco, he leaves his wolfdog White Fang with his friend, Henry Casey. The two immediately form a bond, but enter trouble when washed up on shore while sailing to bring their gold into town.

Meanwhile, a local Native American chief, Moses Joseph, has a dream about White Fang and his niece Lily. He said that Lily will guide them to find the wolf from this dream, whom he believes will help save the starving tribe. Lily sails to the river and hears White Fang barking. She runs to find the source, and sees White Fang, but White Fang suddenly disappears, and Henry appears in his place, leading Lily to believe that the wolf had changed into Henry. She rescues Henry from and brings him back to her home. When Moses tells Henry that he is the wolf, Henry says he's not, and that the wolf was his friend, leading to laughter from the crowd. Meanwhile, back at the river, White Fang managed to save himself. As he makes his way through the wilderness to find Henry, White Fang finds a wolf pack that he follows for a short time. He ultimately decides not to join them, and continues his journey.

Henry goes back to town and sees many hungry people, and Reverend Leland Drury explains the poor state the town is in. The same day, White Fang spots Lily's village, and when Lily sees him, she calls her uncle to show him that it was the wolf she'd seen by the river the day she found Henry. As Moses tries to get a closer look, White Fang is startled and runs away.

The next day, Henry decides to go back to the village, and gives Lily a white shawl as a gift. White Fang, hiding in the forest, spots the wolf pack again, and a female wolf decides to come over and play with him. That night, as he is with the tribe, Henry hears White Fang howling. Henry runs into the forest, calling for White Fang. He finds a wolf, and thinking it's White Fang, calls to him, only to nearly be mauled by what turns out to be another wolf. White Fang intervenes and protects him. Henry calls White Fang to go to the village with him, but White Fang hesitates because of his female wolf companion. Henry understands and lets him go with his friend, but White Fang decides against it and goes back to the village with Henry. That night, Henry has a similar dream to the one Moses had, but this time including Henry himself.

Moses gives Henry a bow and arrows and sends him to the forest to practice his hunting skills. His first shot misses, but surprisingly another arrow hits the target perfectly. When he calls for whoever is there to reveal themselves, the mystery archer is revealed to be Lily. She shows him how to accurately use the bow. Peter, Moses's son, and Henry practice their hunting together. Henry, now romantically interested in Lily, asks Peter how he can impress her. Peter tells him to lean his head on her shoulder and whisper in her ear, then reveals he was joking, and that if he tried that, she would probably break his nose. Moses allows Peter to hunt with Henry. When Lily's aunt asks her husband what will happen next, he says that one of the men will not come back. Lily tries to convince her uncle to let her join Henry, but Moses refuses as women don't hunt.

When the time comes, Henry, White Fang and Peter go into the forest. Lily grabs her bow and secretly slips into the forest to join them. Henry and Peter find the bodies of the previous hunters who never returned. After Henry is almost wounded by a trap, Peter goes to examine the body of one of the hunters, and is suddenly shot at. He tasks Henry to find the caribou and runs to distract a gunman on horseback. Henry and White Fang escape, but his leg gets caught in a snare trap and is pulled up and suspended in mid air. He is nearly killed by a man in a hunting blind, but is saved by Lily, who shoots a fiery arrow in the man's direction, destroying the blind and causing him to run away. Afterwards, Lily gets Henry out of the trap, and they continue on their way. Upon arriving at the hunting grounds, they find the path is blocked by a crude man made wall and the caribou herd cannot pass through.

They go to find out who blocked the caribou but end up falling into a hole, which turns out to be an airshaft to a large gold mine. They discover Reverend Drury is behind the blockade, as he is running an illegal mining operation. They decide to steal some dynamite to clear the path, but along the way, Henry spots the Reverend. Henry accosts the Reverend when he threatens one of the Native American miners and the Reverend offers him a cut of the mine's profits if he just walks away. Henry refuses and ends up shooting the Reverend in the arm as he and Lily run to escape the mine. Henry finds another airshaft and hoists himself up to get out but Lily is captured by Leland's men. Henry escapes the mine, and White Fang defends him from the remaining miners while he sets the dynamite. The explosion clears the path and frees the caribou.

Meanwhile, the Reverend has loaded the gold and a bound Lily onto a wagon and is making a break for it. Henry and White Fang race through the forest to try and save Lily. As the wagon speeds past the cliff edge, White Fang and Henry jump onto the wagon. White Fang lunges at Reverend Drury, sending them both tumbling down the cliffside. Henry tries to grab the reins but to no avail. He then frees Lily from her bonds. The screw on the carriage comes loose, sending the carriage careening towards a cliff as the horses run off. Henry and Lily jump clear before they go over. Reverend Drury climbs back up to the path to see his gold loaded wagon crashing down the cliffside. The Reverend runs toward the wagon but is shocked to find a stampede of caribou barreling toward him, and is trampled to death.

Henry and Lily retrieve a wounded White Fang, and return to the village with him. They find Moses and Katrin, who are grateful Lily is safe, but are also heartbroken at the loss of Peter. White Fang later recovers.

Some time later, Lily gives Henry back his gold which she had found in the remains of his boat, stating Henry can leave now despite his wanting to stay with her. As Henry prepares to leave, the village thanks him for saving them from starvation. Just as he's about to leave, Lily comes running toward him wearing the white shawl he had given her. She says "she chooses" him and they embrace while White Fang's mate emerges from the trees and joins him. Three months later, White Fang and the female wolf have a litter of pups. Henry and Lily arrive at the den and are greeted warmly by the new family.

Cast
Scott Bairstow as Henry Casey, Jack Conroy's best friend and White Fang's new caretaker
Charmaine Craig as Lily Joseph, a Haida princess who thinks he is the human incarnation of the wolf spirit her uncle glimpsed in a dream
Jed the Wolfdog as White Fang, Henry Casey's wolfdog companion
Al Harrington as Moses Joseph, Lily's uncle and the chief of the Haidas
Anthony Ruivivar as Peter Joseph, Lily's cousin and Moses' son
Victoria Racimo as Katrin Joseph, Lily's aunt
Alfred Molina as Reverend Leland Drury, a religious crook who wants to starve the Haida off their land so he can mine for gold
Geoffrey Lewis as Mr. Heath, Reverend Leland's sidekick
Matthew Cowles as Lloyd Halverson, a surly trapper
Ethan Hawke as Jack Conroy, a young prospector who has bequeathed his gold mine and White Fang to Henry Casey
Paul Coeur as Adam John Hale, a Haida major
Woodrow W. Morrison as Bad Dog
Reynold Russ as Leon
Nathan Young as One-Ear
Charles Natkong Sr. as Sshaga-Holy Man
Edward Davis as Sshaga-Apprentice
Bryon Chief-Moon as Matthew
Tom Heaton as Miner 1
Trace Yeomans as Chief's Mother
Thomas Kitchkeesic as Native Boy

Production
Walt Disney Pictures began shooting the film in April 1993. All wild animals in this film were professionally trained by employees of San Bernardino, California's Jungle Exotics. The grizzly bear and white wolf in this film were additionally trained by employees of Vancouver's Creative Animal Talent.

Reception
On the review aggregator website Rotten Tomatoes, White Fang 2 was considered "Fresh", currently holding an approval rating of 71%. Audiences polled by CinemaScore gave the film an average grade of "A−" on an A+ to F scale.

Roger Ebert gave the film three out of four stars, stating: "What's best about the film is a kind of fresh-air exuberance, an innocence. The adventures in this movie are fun - not frightening, violent, or depressing. The villains are bad, but not subhuman, and at the end I was positively grateful for a scene where the bad guy tries to get away in a wagon full of gold, with the heroine tied up behind him, and Henry and the dog trying to save her. This was so old-fashioned it was almost daring." 

Lois Alter Mark of Entertainment Weekly gave the film a B rating, concluding that White Fang 2 would be a better film if the filmmakers gave the "four-legged hero" more screen time. "If only White Fang 2: Myth of the White Wolf had kept the camera on its four-legged hero and let animal trainer Joe Camp (Homeward Bound) work his magic, it too could have been as effective as jujubes in keeping kids glued to their seats." 

Robert Faires of The Austin Chronicle gave the film three out of five stars. He also opined that the movie gets better when the animals are on the screen. "It's best when the wolves are moving. Maybe when the third one is made - the final scene screams ‘White Fang: The Next Generation’ - they'll leave the humans out of it and just run with the pack." The Movie Scene also gave the film three out of five stars, stating that White Fang 2 is not a bad film, but it is inferior to its predecessor and that the movie is pleasant for the young audiences, but is not a great entertainment for adult people. "What this all boils down to is that White Fang 2: Myth of the White Wolf is solid entertainment for its intended young audience but offers little for any adult watching it with their kids."

Rita Kempley of The Washington Post didn't like the film. She praised the animals' performances, but criticized the human actors. "The animal actors are superb - you really think White Fang is a goner in a couple of instances - but the humans have basically reached the level of their own incompetence. Perhaps no one in the cast was able to obey Chief Moses Joseph's injunction to set the inner wolf free. The audience, on the other hand, will surely be howling."

References

External links
  
 
 
 

1990s adventure films
1994 films
American sequel films
Films about dogs
Films based on White Fang
Films set in the Arctic
Films set in Alaska
Walt Disney Pictures films
Films based on American novels
Northern (genre) films
Films scored by John Debney
1994 directorial debut films
Films shot in British Columbia
1990s English-language films